DSAC can stand for:

 Domestic Security Alliance Council, a U.S. governmental/corporate organization
 Defence Scientific Advisory Council, a UK independent scientific advisory committee
 Deep Space Atomic Clock, an atomic clock for precise radio navigation in deep space
 Department of Sports, Arts and Culture, a South Africa government department